Jean-Baptiste Gabriel Alexandre Grosier (17 March 1743 – 8 December 1823) was a French abbé and critic of art and literature who published in 1788 his General Description of China.

Works
De la Chine: ou Description générale de cet empire, rédigée d'après les mémoires de la mission de Pé-Kin

Notes

French literary critics
1743 births
1823 deaths
French male non-fiction writers